Muhammad Yar Shah Naqvi Najafi (1913 in Alipur, Punjab – 1990 in Lahore) was a Pakistani Twelver Shia mujtahid and scholar.

Life
He completed his secondary education in 1932. After completing his secondary education, he decided to study religion. 

For religious studies, Najafi went to Khanewal to study from Allamah Syed Muhammad Baqir Hindi. Later, he traveled to Najaf for higher religious education. After completing his education and receiving Ijaza e Ijtihad from many of his teachers, he came back to Pakistan. He lived in Jalalpur and then came back to his city Alipur and started a madarasa (a place for religious studies) that was known as Jamia Ilmiya Dar-ul-Huda Muhammadia. Najafi died on 20 December 1990 in Lahore, but was buried in Alipur.

Students
His students include:
Syed Muhammad Safder(Chakwal)
Hussain Bakhsh Jarra
Muhammad Hussain Najafi (Sargodha)
Syed Safdar Hussain Najafi (Lahore)
Hafiz Riaz Hussain Najafi (Lahore) (son-in-law, disciple)
Syed Sajid Ali Naqvi
Hassan Raza Ghadeeri (London)

See also
Ayatollahs
List of Ayatollahs
Syed Safdar Hussain Najafi

References

Pakistani grand ayatollahs
Pakistani Shia Muslims
Muhajir people
1990 deaths
1913 births